Bae Jae-woo is a South Korean footballer who plays for Gimpo FC.

References

External links 
 

1993 births
Living people
South Korean footballers
Association football midfielders
K League 1 players
K League 2 players
Jeju United FC players
Ulsan Hyundai FC players
Gimcheon Sangmu FC players
Seoul E-Land FC players
Bucheon FC 1995 players
Gimpo FC players